Hodgkinson is an English-language surname, and may refer to:
Alan Hodgkinson (1936–2015), English footballer
Albert Hodgkinson (1897–1975), English recipient of the Distinguished Conduct Medal
Alison Hodgkinson, South African cricketer
Antony Hodgkinson, English drummer
Bert Hodgkinson (1884–1939), Welsh international footballer
Bert Hodgkinson (footballer, born 1903), English footballer
Charles Hodgkinson, English footballer
Clement Hodgkinson, English naturalist
Colin Hodgkinson, British musician
Debby Hodgkinson, Australian rugby union player
Del Hodgkinson, English professional rugby league footballer
Derek Hodgkinson, British World War II pilot
Eaton Hodgkinson, English engineer
Frances Brett Hodgkinson (1771–1803), American theater actress
Frank Hodgkinson, Australian artist
George Langton Hodgkinson, English priest and cricketer
Gerard Hodgkinson, English cricketer
Gilbert Hodgkinson, English cricketer
Greta Hodgkinson, American-Canadian ballet dancer
Grosvenor Hodgkinson, English lawyer and politician
Harry Hodgkinson (footballer), English footballer
Harry Hodgkinson (writer), English writer
Ian Hodgkinson, Canadian professional wrestler, known as Vampiro
James Hodgkinson (1950–2017), left-wing activist and perpetrator of the Congressional baseball shooting
John Hodgkinson (disambiguation)
Katrina Hodgkinson, Australian politician
Keely Hodgkinson, English athlete
Liz Hodgkinson,  English author and journalist 
Lorna Hodgkinson, Australian educator
Patrick Hodgkinson, English architect
Peter Hodgkinson, British sculptor
Randall Hodgkinson, American pianist
Richard Hodgkinson, English cricketer
Samuel Hodgkinson, New Zealand politician
Sandra Hodgkinson, American lawyer
Simon Hodgkinson, English rugby player
Terry Hodgkinson, English businessman and academic
Tim Hodgkinson, English musician and composer
Tom Hodgkinson, English writer and editor
Toni Hodgkinson, New Zealand athlete
Will Hodgkinson, English journalist and author
William Hodgkinson (politician), Australian explorer, journalist, gold miner, and politician
William Hodgkinson (footballer), Welsh footballer, brother of Bert Hodgkinson

Other uses
 Hodgkinson County, Queensland, an obsolete cadastral division
 Hodgkinsonia, a plant genus
 Hodgkinsonite, a rare mineral

See also
Hodkinson

English-language surnames
Surnames of English origin
Patronymic surnames
Surnames from given names